Jonathan Hudson Connell is an electrical engineer at the IBM T.J. Watson Research Center in Hawthorne, New York.

Connell was named a Fellow of the Institute of Electrical and Electronics Engineers (IEEE) in 2013 for his contributions to security and privacy in biometrics.

References

Fellow Members of the IEEE
Living people
Year of birth missing (living people)
Place of birth missing (living people)
American electrical engineers